Klussmann is a surname. Notable people with the surname include:

 Friedel Klussmann (1896–1986), American prominent member of San Francisco society
 Sebastian Klussmann (born 1989), German quiz player

See also
 Klusemann
 Klusmann